Tungsten(III) iodide or tungsten triiodide is a chemical compound of tungsten and iodine with the formula WI3.

Preparation
Tungsten(III) iodide can be prepared by reducing tungsten hexacarbonyl with iodine.

Properties
Tungsten(III) iodide is a black solid that releases iodine at room temperature, and is less stable than molybdenum(III) iodide. It is soluble in acetone and nitrobenzene, and slightly soluble in chloroform.

References

Iodides
Tungsten halides